This is the discography of American rapper LL Cool J.

Albums

Studio albums

Compilation albums

Singles

As lead artist

As featured artist

Guest appearances
Action Bronson - "Strictly 4 My Jeeps (remix)" (w/ Lloyd Banks) (Album: n/a)
Adam F - "Greatest of All Time" (Album: Kaos: The Anti-Acoustic Warfare)
Alicia Keys - "Teenage Love Affair (Remix) (Album: As I Am)
Allure - "No Question" (Album: Allure)
Allure - "Enjoy Yourself (Remix)" (Album: n/a)
Amerie - "Why Don't We Fall In Love (Remix)" (w/Red Cafe) (Album: n/a)
Babyface - "This Is For The lover In You" (w/Jody Watley, Jeffery Daniels & Howard Hewett) (Album: The Day)
Brandy - "Sittin Up In My Room (remix)" (Album: n/a)
Busta Rhymes - "Killin' Em" (feat. Z-Trip)
Carl Thomas - "I Wish (DJ Clue remix)" (w/Prodigy & Shyne) (Album: n/a)
Carl Thomas - "I Wish (remix)" (w/Puff Daddy) (Album: n/a)
Carl Thomas - "She Is" (Album: Let's Talk About It)
Dave Navarro - "I Make My Own Rules" (w/Chad Smith & Flea) (Album: Private Parts soundtrack)
DJ Kay Slay - "The Truth" (Album: The Streetsweeper Vol. 2: The Pain From The Game)
Dr. Dre - "Zoom" (Album: Bulworth soundtrack)
EPMD - "Rampage" (Album: Business As Usual)
Erick Sermon - "Do-Re-Mi" (w/Scarface) (Album: Music)
Jennifer Lopez - "All I Have" (Album: This Is Me...Then)
Joe Budden - "Focus (remix)" (w/Dutchess) (Album: n/a)
Keith Murray - "Incredible" (Album: It's a Beautiful Thing)
Keith Sweat - "Why Me Baby?" (Album: Keep it Comin)
Kia Shine - "Kripsy (Remix)" (w/Swizz Beatz, Young Buck, Slim Thug, E-40, Remy Ma & Jim Jones) (Album: Due Season)
Kid Ink - "Main Chick (Remix)" (w/Chris Brown & Tyga) (Album: N/A)
LSG - "Curious" (w/Busta Rhymes & MC Lyte) (Album: Levert-Sweat-Gill)
Marley Marl - "I Be Getting' Busy" (Album: In Control Vol.II - For Your Steering Pleasure)
Marley Marl - "Haters" (Album: Hip Hop Dictionary)
Mary J. Blige - "Mary Jane (remix)" (Album: Flava)
Mary Mary - "We're Gonna Make It" (Album: Madea's Family Reunion Soundtrack)
Method Man & Redman - 4 Seasons (w/Ja Rule) (Album: Blackout!)
Michael Jackson - "Serious Effect" (Album: Dangerous (Outtake))
Montell Jordan - "Get It On Tonight (remix)" (Album: n/a)
Mashonda - "Crazy Girl" (Album: Rush Hour 2 (soundtrack))  
Nelly - "Hold Up" (w/T.I.) (Album: Brass Knuckles)
Shanice - "I Got This" (Album: n/a)
Spax - "Blink Blink" (Album: Engel und Ratten)
Swizz Beatz - "Ghetto Love" (w/Mashonda) (Album: Presents G.H.E.T.T.O. Stories)
Taral - "How Do I Get Over You (Remix)" (Album: n/a)
Tori Kelly - "California Lovers" (Album: Unbreakable Smile)
Trackmasters - "Whassup Shawty" (w/Dutchess  & XSO Drive) (Album: n/a)
Various - " I Make My Own Rules" (w/Red Hot Chili Peppers) (Album: Private Parts: The Album)
Various - "Dear Mallika" (Album "The Rapsody Overture, Hip Hop Meets Classic")
Various - "Heal Yourself" (w/Freddie Foxxx, Run DMC, KRS-One, Big Daddy Kane, and others) (Album: H.E.A.L.: Civilization Vs. Technology)
Various - "We Are the World 25 for Haiti"
Various - "Hit Em High" (w/B-Real, Method Man, Coolio & Busta Rhymes) (Album: Space Jam soundtrack)
Various - "What's Going On (Neptunes Mix)" (w/Queen Latifah, Da Brat, Mobb Deep, Royce Da 5'9", and others) (Album: What's Going On)
Various - "Fatty Girl" (w/ Ludacris & Keith Murray) (Album: FB Entertainment Presents: The Good Life)
Velez - "Tonite" (Album: n/a)
Wayne Wonder - "No Letting Go (remix)" (w/Dutchess) (Album: n/a)

Music videos

Notes

References 

Hip hop discographies
Discographies of American artists
Discography